Sexual Minorities Uganda (SMUG) is an umbrella non-governmental organization based in Kampala, Uganda.

In August 2022 SMUG was ordered by the Ugandan government to immediately shut down.

Organisation 
Founders included Victor Mukasa and Sylvia Tamale. Executive director Frank Mugisha and deputy director Pepe Julian Onziema both took office in 2007. Advocacy officer David Kato was the advocacy and litigation officer until his murder in January 2011. SMUG advocates for the protection and promotion of human rights of lesbian, gay, bisexual, and transgender (LGBT) Ugandans.

A network composed of several member organizations was founded in 2004:
 Icebreakers Uganda, concerned with LGBT research and youth issues.
 Freedom & Roam Uganda, dedicated to the rights of lesbian, transgender, and intersex women
 Spectrum Uganda, focused on the health and well-being of LGBT people in Uganda (co-founded by John "Longjones" Abdallah Wambere)
Transgender Initiative Uganda addresses transgender issues.

History
Victor Mukasa, a trans man activist, founded Sexual Minorities Uganda on 3 March 2004 in Kampala at the Kaival restaurant and Internet cafe. The earliest members included Val Kalende. Kamuhangire.E and David Kato, who were among the first board members. Members of SMUG achieved controversy through their activism and legal troubles for much of the organization's history, and the profile of the organization in the later-2000s due to the rise of homophobic populism in the country and the introduction of the Uganda Anti-Homosexuality Bill in the Parliament by David Bahati.

The Ugandan newspaper Rolling Stone, a publication unrelated to the American magazine of the same name, which rejected the Ugandan paper and called its actions as "horrific", published a gallery of "100 Pictures of Uganda's Top Homos Leak" and stated "Hang Them". In response, four members of SMUG whose faces appeared in the magazine, David Kato Kisule, Kasha Nabagesera, Nabirye Mariam, and Pepe Julian Onziema "Patience", filed a petition with the High Court seeking to force the paper to cease distribution of the article. The court granted the petition on 2 November 2010, effectively ending the publication of Ugandan Rolling Stone.

On 26 January 2011, Kato, whose picture had been featured on the cover of the issue of Rolling Stone in question, was assaulted in his home in Mukono Town by his acquaintance Sidney Nsubuga Enoch, 22, who hit him twice in the head with a hammer found in Kato's bathroom before fleeing on foot. The apparent motive was a disagreement about sexual services and robbery. Kato died en route to the Kawolo Hospital. The murder was decried by Human Rights Watch and senior Africa researcher Maria Burnett said that "David Kato's death is a tragic loss to the human rights community".

On 15 September 2011, SMUG's executive director Frank Mugisha was named the recipient of the annual Robert F. Kennedy Human Rights Award for his activism. Mugisha also received the Rafto Prize for Human Rights on behalf of SMUG on 6 September 2011.

In 2012, SMUG and several Ugandans, including Onziema, Mukasa, and Mugisha, together with the Center for Constitutional Rights initiated legal action in U.S. Federal District Court using the Alien Tort Statute to sue American evangelist Scott Lively for crimes against humanity for his work on the Uganda's Anti-Homosexuality Bill.  Lively's work has been described as inciting the persecution of gay men and lesbians and as "conduct ... actively trying to harm and deprive other people of their rights". In August 2013, Judge Michael A. Ponsor ruled that the plaintiffs were on solid ground under international and federal law in rejecting a jurisdictional challenge to the suit. He also ruled that First Amendment defenses for Lively's conduct were premature.

In August 2022 SMUG was ordered by the Ugandan government to immediately shut down. The government said that SMUG had failed to properly register its name with the National Bureau for Non-Governmental Organizations. The NGO Bureau  issued a statement saying that SMUG's registration attempt in 2012 was rejected because its full name was deemed "undesirable". In response to the shutdown order, executive director Frank Mugisha called it "a clear witch hunt rooted in systematic homophobia, fuelled by anti-gay and anti-gender movements."

See also
List of LGBT rights organizations

References

External links
 Sexual Minorities Uganda - official website 
 Sexual Minorities Uganda - official website (USA office)
 Sexual Minorities Uganda - Instagram 
 Sexual Minorities Uganda: The Case Against Scott Lively

LGBT political advocacy groups in Uganda
Organizations established in 2004
2004 establishments in Uganda
Organizations that support LGBT people